William Stewart MacMillan (born March 7, 1943) is a Canadian former hockey coach and player. MacMillan played and later coached in the National Hockey League (NHL). After several years with the Canadian national team, including playing at two World Championships and the 1968 Winter Olympics, winning a bronze medal, MacMillan made his NHL debut in 1970 with the Toronto Maple Leafs. He played for Toronto, the Atlanta Flames, and New York Islanders between 1970 and 1977, and retired from playing in 1978. He became a coach during his final year, spent in the minor CHL and moved to the NHL in 1979 when he became an assistant coach for the Islanders. He was named the head coach of the Colorado Rockies in 1980, also serving as general manager the next season. MacMillan stayed with the team as they relocated in 1982 to become the New Jersey Devils, and was let go early in the 1983–84 season. Billy is the brother of Bob MacMillan.

Early career
MacMillan grew up in Prince Edward Island and excelled at a variety of sports, including hockey, rugby, and track. He left home as a teenager for the more fertile hockey ground of Ontario. He appeared in three Memorial Cup tournaments with the powerful St. Michael's Majors junior team. He later played university hockey at the now merged Saint Dunstan's University, after returning to PEI to complete his academic studies. He subsequently appeared in various minor leagues.

NHL career
A powerful body checker and solid defensive forward, MacMillan was a late bloomer who did not make an NHL roster until age 27. He scored a surprising 22 goals as a rookie with the Toronto Maple Leafs, but saw his playing time reduced the next season. He was selected in the 1972 expansion draft by the Atlanta Flames, playing in a checking role with the team during its inaugural season. He was then traded to the New York Islanders, where he played for an additional four years. After failing to make the NHL roster in 1977, he played one year with the Fort Worth Texans before retiring.

Coaching career
MacMillan was hired as an assistant coach by Al Arbour with the New York Islanders for the 1979-80 season, and he helped lead this franchise to its first Stanley Cup. The next season, he was hired by the Colorado Rockies to serve a dual role as general manager and head coach. After one season, he was relieved of his coaching duties, but after the team moved and became the New Jersey Devils in 1982, he returned to a capacity behind the bench. He was fired 20 games into the following season.

In 1985, Billy MacMillan was inducted into the PEI Sports Hall of Fame.

Career statistics

Regular season and playoffs

International

Coaching record

References

External links
 

1943 births
Living people
Atlanta Flames players
Canadian expatriate ice hockey players in the United States
Canadian ice hockey centres
Canadian ice hockey coaches
Canadian people of Scottish descent
Colorado Rockies (NHL)
Colorado Rockies (NHL) coaches
Fort Worth Texans players
Ice hockey people from Prince Edward Island
Ice hockey players at the 1968 Winter Olympics
Medalists at the 1968 Winter Olympics
New Jersey Devils coaches
New Jersey Devils executives
New York Islanders coaches
New York Islanders players
Olympic bronze medalists for Canada
Olympic ice hockey players of Canada
Olympic medalists in ice hockey
Ontario Hockey Association Senior A League (1890–1979) players
Rhode Island Reds players
Sportspeople from Charlottetown
Stanley Cup champions
Sudbury Wolves (EPHL) players
Toronto Maple Leafs players
Toronto Neil McNeil Maroons players
Toronto St. Michael's Majors players
Tulsa Oilers (1964–1984) players